Danning can mean:

Christian Danning (1867-1925), Danish composer and conductor
Harry Danning (1911–2004), American Major League Baseball player
Ike Danning (1905–1983), American Major League Baseball catcher 
Kofi Danning (born 1991), Ghanaian-born Australian footballer 
Sybil Danning (born 1952), Austrian actress, model and film producer